The Queen of Biarritz (French: La reine de Biarritz) is a 1934 French comedy film directed by Jean Toulout and starring Alice Field, Léon Belières and Marguerite Moreno.

The film's sets were designed by Jean d'Eaubonne.

Cast
 Alice Field as Elenita  
 Léon Belières as Ramondin  
 Marguerite Moreno as La mère  
 André Burgère as Gaston Melville  
 Renée Devilder as Marguerite Charencel  
 Arlette Dubreuil as Denise  
 Jean Dax as Charencel, le beau-père 
 Henry Bonvallet as Comte Bolinsky  
 Raoul Marco as Esteban, le mari  
 Jackie Maud as La fleuriste  
 Pierre Moreno as Prosper  
 Jean Toulout

References

Bibliography 
 Rège, Philippe. Encyclopedia of French Film Directors, Volume 1. Scarecrow Press, 2009.

External links 
 

1934 films
1934 comedy films
French comedy films
1930s French-language films
Films set in France
French black-and-white films
1930s French films